Charles Christian Yingling (December 7, 1865 - April 13, 1897) was a professional baseball player. Yingling played in one game in Major League Baseball with the Philadelphia Phillies in 1894 as a shortstop. He had one hit in four at bats. Yingling was born and died in Baltimore, Maryland.

Coincidentally, Charlie's brother, Joe Yingling, also appeared in just one major league game, in his case as a pitcher. In 1887, the two were teammates on the minor league baseball team in Haverhill, Massachusetts.

External links

Major League Baseball shortstops
Philadelphia Phillies players
Haverhill (minor league baseball) players
Baseball players from Baltimore
19th-century baseball players
1865 births
1897 deaths